This is an international list of osteopathic schools, universities, colleges, and medical schools that award a recognized osteopathic qualification or an osteopathic medical degree. The degrees of non-medical osteopathy conferred vary widely, and include: Certificates, Diplomas (such as Diploma in Osteopathic Manual Practice - DOMP), Bachelors (such as bachelor of science in osteopathy), Masters (such as master of art in Osteopathic history), Doctor of Philosophy (PhD), or Diploma in Osteopathy. These non-medical osteopathic degrees are different from an osteopathic medical degree (Doctor of Osteopathic Medicine) that are solely offered by 37 medical schools in the United States. All 37 US osteopathic medical schools are listed as medical schools in the World Directory of Medical Schools, since they confer the D.O., a medical degree in Western medicine and surgery. Currently, only graduates of American osteopathic medical colleges are considered physicians who may practice the full scope of medicine and surgery.

Argentina 
 Escuela Osteopática de Buenos Aires 
 Osteopathic Centre for Studies in Buenos Aires and Patagonia

Australia 
 The Royal Melbourne Institute of Technology
 Southern Cross University
 Victoria University

Austria
 Vienna School of Osteopathy

Belgium
 FICO Osteopathy Academy
 International Academy of Osteopathy

Brasil
 IDOT Instituto Docusse de Osteopatia e Terapia Manual

Canada 

 Canadian Academy of Osteopathy
 Canadian College of Osteopathy
 Centre Ostéopathique du Québec
 Collège d'Études Ostéopathiques
 EPOQ École Professionnelle des Ostéopathes du Québec
 Établissementd’Enseignement Supérieur d’Ostéopathie du Canada
 National Academy of Osteopathy
 Ontario Academy of Progressive Osteopathy
 Ontario School of Osteopathy
 Southern Ontario College of Osteopathy

Croatia 
 Hrvatska akademija osteopatije

England (United Kingdom) 
 British College of Osteopathic Medicine
 College of Osteopaths
 European School of Osteopathy
 London School of Osteopathy
 Plymouth Marjon University
 Swansea University
 University College of Osteopathy

Finland
 Metropolia University of Applied Sciences
 OOKK Ortopedisen osteopatian koulutuskeskus
 Osteopatiakoulu Atlas

France 
 CEESO Centre Europeen d'Enseignement Superieur de l'Osteopathie
 CIDO Centre International d'Ostéopathie
 EFSO Ecole Française Supérieure d'Ostéopathie
 ESO Ecole Supérieure d'Ostéopathie
 HOLISTÉA (ex Collège Ostéopathique Européen)
 IdHEO Institut Des Hautes Etudes Osteopathique De Nantes
 IFOGA Institut de Formation en Ostéopathie du Grand-Avignon

Germany 
 Deutsches Osteopathie Kolleg (Rohdorf, Germany)
 Still Academy
 Osteopathy Academy of Munich
 German School of Osteopathy
 International Academy of Osteopathy

India
 Sri Sri University

Ireland
 The Irish College of Osteopathic Medicine (ICOM)

Italy
 AbeOS Abe Osteopathy School
 AIMO Accademia Italiana di Medicina Osteopatica
 AOI Advanced Osteopathy Institute
 CIO Collegio Italiano Osteopatia
 CROMON Centro Ricerche Olistiche per la Medicina Osteopatica e Naturale
 CSdOI Centro Studi di Osteopatia Italiano
 CSOT Centro Studi di Osteopatia Tradizionale 
 EIOM European Institute for Osteopathic Medicine
 ICOM International College of Osteopathic Medicine
 ISO Istituto Superiore di Osteopatia
 SOMA Istituto Osteopatia Milano
 SSOI Scuola Superiore di Osteopatia Italiana

New Zealand 
 Ara Institute of Canterbury

Netherlands
 Osteopathie College Sutherland
 International Academy of Osteopathy

Norway 
 Kristiania University College

Poland
 Akademia Osteopatii
 FICO-MUM

Ukraine
 East-European School of Osteopathy

Russia 
 Институт остеопатии Санкт-Петербурга
 Russian Academy of Osteopathic Medicine
 Russian School of Osteopathic Medicine
 Проект Остеопрактика
 V. Andrianov Institute of Osteopathic Medicine

Spain 
 ECO Escuela del Concepto Osteopático
 EOB Escola d'Osteopatia de Barcelona
 EOM Escuela de Osteopatía de Madrid
 FBEO Formación Belga Española de Osteopatía
 NUMSS National University of Medical Sciences

Sweden
 Skandinaviska Osteopathögskolan

United States 

There are 37 osteopathic medical schools in the United States, which train "osteopathic physicians". Osteopathic physicians are fully qualified medical doctors holding the Doctor of Osteopathic Medicine (DO) degree, and they are licensed to perform surgery and prescribe medications in addition to osteopathic manual treatment. Osteopaths from any schools outside of the country are not permitted to practice in the U.S. as osteopathic physicians. The foreign-trained osteopaths, however, are permitted to practice as osteopathic manual practitioners. These manual osteopaths are permitted only to use manual techniques and may not perform surgery nor prescribe medications.

 A.T. Still University, with a Kirksville, Missouri campus and an Arizona campus
 Alabama College of Osteopathic Medicine
 Arkansas College of Osteopathic Medicine
 Burrell College of Osteopathic Medicine
 California Health Sciences University College of Osteopathic Medicine (CHSU-COM)
 Campbell University School of Osteopathic Medicine
 Des Moines University
 Edward Via College of Osteopathic Medicine, with Auburn, Virginia, Carolinas and Louisiana campuses
 Idaho College of Osteopathic Medicine (ICOM)
 Kansas City University of Medicine and Biosciences, with campuses in Kansas City and Joplin
 Lake Erie College of Osteopathic Medicine, with campuses in Bradenton, Florida, Erie, Pennsylvania, and Elmira, New York
 Liberty University
 Lincoln Memorial University, with campuses in Harrogate and Knoxville
 Marian University College of Osteopathic Medicine
 Michigan State University College of Osteopathic Medicine with campuses in East Lansing, Clinton Township and Detroit
 Midwestern University, with campuses in Chicago and Arizona
 New York Institute of Technology College of Osteopathic Medicine with campuses in New York and Arkansas
 Noorda College of Osteopathic Medicine
 Nova Southeastern University College of Osteopathic Medicine, with campuses in Fort Lauderdale and Clearwater, Florida
 Ohio University Heritage College of Osteopathic Medicine, with campuses in Athens, Dublin, Cleveland  
 Oklahoma State University Center for Health Sciences, with campuses in Tulsa and Tahlequah
 Pacific Northwest University of Health Sciences
 Philadelphia College of Osteopathic Medicine, with campuses in Philadelphia and Georgia
 Rocky Vista University, with campuses in Colorado and South Utah
 Rowan-Virtua School of Osteopathic Medicine
 Sam Houston State University College of Osteopathic Medicine
 Touro College of Osteopathic Medicine – New York City and Middletown
 Touro University California
 Touro University Nevada
 University of New England College of Osteopathic Medicine
 University of North Texas Health Science Center
 University of Pikeville College of Osteopathic Medicine
 University of the Incarnate Word School of Osteopathic Medicine
 West Virginia School of Osteopathic Medicine
 Western University of Health Sciences, with a California campus and an Oregon campus
 William Carey University

Academic networks
 American Association of Colleges of Osteopathic Medicine
 OsEAN Osteopathic European Academic Network

See also 
 Osteopathy
 Doctor of Osteopathic Medicine

Notes and references

Lists of universities and colleges
Osteopathic manipulative medicine